The Cape spiny mouse (Acomys subspinosus) is a murid rodent found in the Western Cape Province of South Africa. They have a dorsal covering of spiny hairs with dark grey-brown coloration, and a white underbelly. The Cape Spiny Mouse has large eyes and ears and a scaly, nearly bald tail that is brittle and can break off readily either as a whole or in part if it is caught.

Range

This species is largely endemic to the Western Cape Province of South Africa; its range just extends into the Eastern and Northern Cape Provinces. The extent of occurrence is greater than 20,000 km², and can occur up to about 1,000m above sea level.

Habitat

Its natural habitats are Mediterranean-type shrubby vegetation and rocky areas. They are terrestrial and nocturnal, but can be active in early morning and late afternoon in shadows cast by rocks.

Behavior

Cape spiny mice may live singly or in small groups. They feed almost exclusively on seeds, especially ant dispersed seeds of Restionaceae and Proteaceae with elaiosomes. The remainder of the diet consists of green plant material and insects, millipedes, and snails.  In addition, the cape spiny mouse feed extensively on P. humiflora flower.

Breeding

Rather than having one set breeding season, cape spiny mice are opportunistic breeders, only reproducing when they have sufficient food sources.  They produce litters of 2-5 pups.

Value

Cape spiny mouse. contributes significantly to the pollination of Protea humiflora, and, in turn, gains the food resources that enable winter breeding. In addition to being a potential pollinator for a number of plant species, it also has a role in seed predation and hoarding in the fynbos, potentially contributing to the evolution of myrmecochory as a mechanism to evade rodent seed predation.

References

 Chris Stuart, T. S. (Ed.). (1988). A Field Guide to Mammals of South Africa (3rd ed.). Cape Town: New England Publishing.
 "African spiny mouse." Encyclopædia Britannica. Encyclopædia Britannica Online Academic Edition. Encyclopædia Britannica Inc., 2014. Web. 20 Feb. 2014. <http://www.britannica.com/EBchecked/topic/560260/African-spiny-mouse>.
 Schlitter, D. & Taylor, P.J. 2008. Acomys subspinosus. In: IUCN 2013. IUCN Red List of Threatened Species. Version 2013.2. <www.iucnredlist.org>. Downloaded on 21 February 2014.
 Musser, G. G.; Carleton, M. D. (2005). "Superfamily Muroidea". In Wilson, D. E.; Reeder, D. M. Mammal Species of the World (3rd ed.). Johns Hopkins University Press. pp. 894–1531. . OCLC 62265494.
 Fleming, P., Nicolson, S. (2011). Opportunistic breeding in the cape spiny mouse (acomys subspinosus
African Zoology, 37(1) 
 Nel J.A.J., Rautenbach I.L. & Breytenbach G.J. 1980. Mammals of the Kammanassie Mountains, southern Cape Province. South African Journal of Zoology 15: 255–261.
 Breytenbach G.J. 1982. Small mammal responses to environmental gradients in the Great Swartberg of the southern Cape.MScthesis, University of Pretoria, Pretoria, South Africa.
 Bond W., Ferguson M. & Forsyth G. 1980. Small mammals and habitat structure along altitudinal gradients in the southern Cape mountains. South African Journal of Zoology 15: 34–43.
 Wiens, Delbert; Rourke, John P.; Casper, Brenda B.; Rickart, Eric A.; LaPine, T.R.; Peterson,J.; Channing, A: Nonflying Mammal Pollination of Southern African Proteas. Annals of the Missouri Botanical Garden Vol 70, number 1, 1983
 Bond W.J. & Breytenbach G.J. 1985. Ants, rodents and seed predation in Proteaceae. South African Journal of Zoology 20: 150–154

Endemic fauna of South Africa
Acomys
Mammals of South Africa
Mammals described in 1838
Taxonomy articles created by Polbot